Sevis may refer to:

SEVIS, the Student and Exchange Visitor Information System
Sevis, Iran, a village in Fars Province, Iran
Seewis im Prättigau, a municipality in Switzerland